In the mathematical subject of geometric group theory, an acylindrically hyperbolic group is a group admitting a non-elementary 'acylindrical' isometric action on some geodesic hyperbolic metric space. This notion generalizes the notions of a hyperbolic group and of a relatively hyperbolic group and includes a significantly wider class of examples, such as mapping class groups and Out(Fn).

Formal definition

Acylindrical action

Let G be a group with an isometric action on some geodesic hyperbolic metric space X. This action is called acylindrical if for every  there exist  such that for every  with  one has

If the above property holds for a specific , the action of G on X is called R-acylindrical.  The notion of acylindricity provides a suitable substitute for being a proper action in the more general context where non-proper actions are allowed. 

It is known (Theorem 1.1 in ) that an acylindrical action of a group G on a geodesic hyperbolic metric space X is non-elementary if and only if this action has unbounded orbits in X and the group G is not a finite extension of a cyclic group generated by loxodromic isometry of X.

Acylindrically hyperbolic group

A group G is called acylindrically hyperbolic if G admits a non-elementary acylindrical isometric action on some geodesic hyperbolic metric space X.

Equivalent characterizations 

It is known (Theorem 1.2 in ) that for a group G the following conditions are equivalent:

The group G is acylindrically hyperbolic.
The group G is not virtually cyclic, and there exists an isometric action of G on a geodesic hyperbolic metric space X such that at least one element of G acts on X with the WPD ('Weakly Properly Discontinuous') property.
The group G contains a proper infinite 'hyperbolically embedded' subgroup.

History

Properties

Every acylindrically hyperbolic group G is SQ-universal, that is, every countable group embeds as a subgroup in some quotient group of G. 
The class of acylindrically hyperbolic groups is closed under taking infinite normal subgroups, and, more generally, under taking 's-normal' subgroups. Here a subgroup  is called s-normal in  if for every  one has . 
Every acylindrically hyperbolic group G admits a unique maximal normal finite subgroup denoted K(G).
If G is an acylindrically hyperbolic group with K(G)={1} then G has infinite conjugacy classes of nontrivial elements, G is not inner amenable, and the reduced C*-algebra of G is simple with unique trace.
There is a version of small cancellation theory over acylindrically hyperbolic groups, allowing one to produce many quotients of such groups with prescribed properties.
Every finitely generated acylindrically hyperbolic group has cut points in all of its asymptotic cones.
Every finitely generated acylindrically hyperbolic group G has exponential conjugacy growth, meaning that the number of distinct conjugacy classes of elements of G coming from the ball of radius n in the Cayley graph of G grows exponentially in n.

Examples and non-examples

Finite groups, virtually nilpotent groups and virtually solvable groups are not acylindrically hyperbolic.
Every non-elementary subgroup of a word-hyperbolic group is acylindrically hyperbolic.
Every non-elementary relatively hyperbolic group is acylindrically hyperbolic. 
The mapping class group  of a connected oriented surface of genus  with  punctures is acylindrically hyperbolic, except for the cases where  (in those exceptional cases the mapping class group is finite).  
For  the group Out(Fn) is acylindrically hyperbolic. 
By a result of Osin, every non virtually cyclic group G, that admits a proper isometric action on a proper CAT(0) space with G having at least one rank-1 element, is acylindrically hyperbolic. Caprace and Sageev proved that if G is a finitely generated group acting isometrically properly discontinuously and cocompactly on a geodetically complete CAT(0) cubical complex X, then either X splits as a direct product of two unbounded convex subcomplexes, or G contains a rank-1 element.  
Every right-angled Artin group G, which is not cyclic and which is directly indecomposable, is acylindrically hyperbolic. 
For  the special linear group  is not acylindrically hyperbolic (Example 7.5 in ).
For  the Baumslag–Solitar group  is not acylindrically hyperbolic. (Example 7.4 in )
Many groups admitting nontrivial actions on simplicial trees (that is, admitting nontrivial splittings as fundamental groups of graphs of groups in the sense of Bass–Serre theory) are acylindrically hyperbolic. For example, all one-relator groups on at least three generators are acylindrically hyperbolic.
Most 3-manifold groups are acylindrically hyperbolic.

References

Further reading

Group theory
Geometric group theory
Geometric topology
Geometry